Public Media Connect, Inc. is a non-profit organization that owns southwest Ohio's largest PBS member television stations. It was formed in 2009 from the merger of the Greater Cincinnati Television Educational Foundation, which operates WCET in Cincinnati under the "CET" brand, and Greater Dayton Public Television, whose "ThinkTV" brand is shared by WPTD in Dayton and WPTO in Oxford, along with a translator in Maplewood. CET and ThinkTV continue to operate as subsidiary non-profits under the Public Media Connect umbrella organization.  Combined, the three stations serve a potential audience of 3.3 million people in Ohio, Kentucky and Indiana.

Until July 2010, the three stations maintained separate production and control staff. In July 2010, master control for both stations was centralized in Dayton, in order to reduce costs. They continue to maintain distinct program schedules and conduct separate fundraising efforts.  Public Media Connect enables the stations to pool resources, again saving scarce financial and personnel resources from unnecessary duplication.

See also
Cincinnati Public Radio Inc.

References

External links
Public Media Connect website
Public Media Connect Board of Trustees – ThinkTV website

Mass media in Cincinnati
Mass media in Dayton, Ohio
Public television in the United States
Organizations established in 2009
2009 establishments in Ohio